The Suriname national cricket team is the team that represents Suriname in international cricket. The team is organised by the Suriname Cricket Board, which has been an associate member of the International Cricket Council (ICC) since 2011 (and previous an affiliate member from 2002).

Suriname made its international debut at the 2004 Americas Affiliates Championship in Panama, where it placed last. At the 2006 ICC Americas Championship, the team won the division three event, and was promoted to division two for the 2008 edition. Suriname also won that event, and were promoted to the 2008 Division One tournament in the United States, but were immediately relegated after going winless. Since then, Suriname has generally alternated between the first and second divisions of ICC Americas events, most recently placing fourth (out of four teams) at the 2015 Americas Twenty20 Championship.

In the World Cricket League (WCL), the team placed last in the 2009 Division Seven tournament and fifth (out of eight teams) at the 2010 Division Eight tournament, relegating it to the regional qualifiers. Suriname re-entered the WCL system at the 2015 Division Six event in England, and subsequently qualified for 2016 Division Five. However, they later withdrew from the Division Five tournament due to an ICC investigation about the eligibility of some of their players.

In April 2018, the ICC decided to grant full Twenty20 International (T20I) status to all its members. Therefore, all Twenty20 matches played between Suriname and other ICC members after 1 January 2019 will be a full T20I.

History
Suriname became an affiliate member of the International Cricket Council in 2002. Their international debut came in 2004 at the Americas Affiliates Championship, where they came last in the five team tournament. A big improvement came two years later in the new Division Three of the ICC Americas Championship when they won a four team tournament also involving Brazil, Chile and the Turks and Caicos Islands. This qualified them for the Division Two tournament played in Argentina late in 2006, when they came fourth out of five teams, which means that they will keep their Division Two place in 2008.

Suriname placed fifth at the 2009 Global Division Seven tournament and was relegated to Division Eight, where it placed fifth to again be relegated.

Tournament history

ICC World Cricket League
 2009 Division Seven: 6th – relegated
 2010 Division Eight: 5th – relegated
 2015 Division Six: 1st – promoted
 2016 Division Five: Pull Out

ICC Americas Championship

 2000–04: Did not participate
 2006: Division Three won, Division Two fourth place
 2008: Division Two won, Division One sixth place
 2010: Division Two second place
 2011 ICC Americas Twenty20 Division One
 2013 ICC Americas Twenty20 Division One: Third place
 2015 ICC Americas Twenty20 Division One: Fourth place

Records

One-day 
Below is a record of international matches played in the one-day format by Suriname between 2004 and 2015.

See also
 Bat-en-bal

References

Cricket in Suriname
National cricket teams
Cricket
Suriname in international cricket